Jahanabad (also Romanized as Jahānābād; also known as Jahānābād-e Bālā and Jahānābād Bālā) is a village in Khalazir Rural District, Aftab District, Tehran County, Tehran Province, Iran. At the 2006 census, its population was 61, in 15 families.

References 

Populated places in Tehran County